"We Like to Party" is the fourth single of the Party Animals and the first release from their second album Party@worldaccess.nl. The song was released in 1997 and was their first single which was not cover of an existing song. The song peaked at number 6 in the Dutch Top 40 and a number 67 position in the end of the year list of 1997.

Track listing

Chart

Weekly charts

Year-end charts

References

External links
 Official site

Songs about parties
1997 singles
Party Animals (music group) songs
1997 songs